Sankt Stefan-Afiesl is a municipality in Rohrbach District of Upper Austria, Austria.  As of 1 January 2019, population was 1100.

The municipality was formed on 1 May 2019 by merging two municipalities, Sankt Stefan am Walde and Afiesl.

Localities 
The municipality includes the following populated places (Ortschaften), with population as of 1 January 2019:

References

Cities and towns in Rohrbach District